Fabien "Fari" Lewis (born 10 August 1982) is a retired professional footballer from Trinidad and Tobago.

Career

Youth and college
Lewis attended Naparima College, and came from his native Trinidad to the United States to play college soccer at Canisius College in 2003. At Canisius Lewis was honoured with the MAAC All Rookie, All Conference, All Region Team nominations, and was the Conference Defensive Player of the Year in 2003, prior to transferring to George Mason University as a junior in 2006. At George Mason he was named team Defensive Player of the Year, NSCAA All-South Atlantic Region Third Team, CAA All-Conference Second team and CAA All-Tournament Team.

Professional
Lewis signed for the Western Mass Pioneers in the USL Second Division in 2007, and made his professional debut on 27 April 2007 in the Pioneers' 2–0 opening day loss to the Charlotte Eagles. While at Western Mass Pioneers, his defensive efforts were credited with several USL Second Division Team of the Week honours.

He decided to play for the Michigan Bucks the following season in the USL Premier Development League playing 10 games for the team helping to guide them to their Great Lakes Division title and regular season championship, before signing for the Real Maryland Monarchs in 2009. While at the Monarchs, he played an integral role in anchoring the teams' defence; helping guide them to their first ever quarter-finals spot in the post-season.

He later went on to sign with Atlético de San Juan FC of the Puerto Rico Soccer League. While with Atletico, he was part of the teams surprising play-offs semi-final victory against Club Atlético River Plate Puerto Rico. As a result, Atlético de San Juan FC advanced to the grand final where they played Bayamón FC in a home and away series but eventually lost 3–2 on aggregate.

In 2012, Fabien moved to Singapore to play for Woodlands Wellington FC in the S-League. He has been praised for his solid performance at the back on his debut against Courts Young Lions.

On 14 January 2013, Lewis favoured playing in the TT Pro League and signed with newcomers, Central F.C. for the closing stage of the league 2012/2013 season. Central F.C. is owned by former World Cup and Dundee United player Brent Sancho and coached by former Tottenham Hotspur F.C. and former England national football team player, Terry Fenwick. On 16 February, Lewis made his debut for Central FC against 2012 Concacaf club championship participant, Caledonia AIA. Fabien had an assist in a goal where Central FC went on to win the game 3–2.

During the March 2013 mid season United Football League transfer window, Fabien successfully acquired a contract with Kaya FC.

Club career statistics

Fabien Lewis's Profile

International
Lewis made appearances for Trinidad and Tobago's U-17 and U-23 teams. In December 2002, he was invited by Hannibal Najar to train with the senior national team but did not make a single official cap.

Coaching
In May 2015, he was appointed as interim head coach of Kaya F.C. after their former head coach resigned at the middle of the 2015 United Football League season. He served the post until the end of the season and helped Kaya F.C. qualify for the 2016 edition of AFC Cup (the first time in the club's history).

In April 2019, Coach Fabien was announced as Director of Coaching U9-U12 at Lee Mount Vernon Sports Club in Alexandria, Virginia. Drawing on his experience as a player and coach, he guides the technical and tactical direction for both boys and girls at the earliest level of training in travel soccer. In September 2020, Coach Fabien was promoted to Director of Coaching of the entire club and then in 2022 was promoted to Technical Director.

References

External links
Real Maryland Monarchs bio
George Mason bio

1982 births
Living people
Trinidad and Tobago footballers
Flint City Bucks players
Real Maryland F.C. players
Western Mass Pioneers players
Atlético de San Juan FC players
Woodlands Wellington FC players
USL Second Division players
USL League Two players
Singapore Premier League players
Kaya F.C. players
Trinidad and Tobago expatriate footballers
Trinidad and Tobago expatriate sportspeople in the United States
Expatriate soccer players in the United States
Expatriate footballers in Singapore
Expatriate footballers in the Philippines
Trinidad and Tobago football managers
United Football League (Philippines) head coaches
Association football defenders